Adriana Johanna "Ria" Visser (born 20 July 1961) is a former ice speed skater from the Netherlands

Visser participated in six World Allround Speed Skating Championships, performing best at her first attempt in 1979, when she came in 6th. In 1979 and 1980 she won the bronze medal in the World Junior Speed Skating Championships. At the 1980 Winter Olympics in Lake Placid she won the silver medal in the women's 1500 metres, finishing just behind her Dutch teammate Annie Borckink. At the 1984 Winter Olympics she raced three distances, but did not reach higher than a 13th place. Unlike in international events, Visser was very successful at the Dutch National Allround Championships, winning the event five times and coming in second twice. Only Stien Kaiser has been more successful at the national level.

In the 1990s she was a TV commentator for the Dutch sports program NOS Studio Sport.

Personal records

Tournament overview

 ** fell
source:

References

External links
 Ria Visser at SpeedSkatingStats.com
 Blog.seniorennet.be
  Ria Visser at SchaatsStatistieken.nl

1961 births
Living people
Dutch sports journalists
Dutch women journalists
Dutch television presenters
Olympic medalists in speed skating
Olympic silver medalists for the Netherlands
Olympic speed skaters of the Netherlands
People from Oud-Beijerland
Speed skaters at the 1980 Winter Olympics
Speed skaters at the 1984 Winter Olympics
Dutch female speed skaters
Medalists at the 1980 Winter Olympics
Dutch women television presenters
20th-century Dutch women